Noel Adrian Brett (born 8 September 1975) is a former English cricketer.  Brett was a right-handed batsman who bowled right-arm off break.  He was born at Aldershot, Hampshire.

Brett represented the Surrey Cricket Board in List A matches against the Gloucestershire Cricket Board and the Essex Cricket Board in the 1st and 2nd rounds of the 2003 Cheltenham & Gloucester Trophy which was played in 2002. In his 2 List A matches, he scored 2 runs at a batting average of 2.00, with a high score of 2. With the ball he took a single wickets at a bowling average of 129.00, with best figures of 1/48.

He appeared on the game show You Bet! with the challenge to run out 20 unguarded wickets within two minutes. He succeeded with 14 seconds to spare.

References

External links
Noel Brett at Cricinfo
Noel Brett at CricketArchive

1975 births
Living people
Cricketers from Aldershot
English cricketers
Surrey Cricket Board cricketers